The 1967 Tennessee Volunteers football team represented the University of Tennessee in the 1967 NCAA University Division football season. Playing as a member of the Southeastern Conference (SEC), the team was led by head coach Doug Dickey, in his fourth year, and played their home games at Neyland Stadium in Knoxville, Tennessee. They finished the season with a record of nine wins and two losses (9–2 overall, 6–0 in the SEC) as SEC Champions and with a loss against Oklahoma in the Orange Bowl. The Volunteers' offense scored 283 points while the defense allowed 141 points. At season's end, Tennessee was recognized as national champions by Litkenhous. Lester McClain became the first African American player in the program.

Schedule

Personnel

Team players drafted into the NFL

References

Tennessee
Tennessee Volunteers football seasons
Southeastern Conference football champion seasons
Tennessee Volunteers football